Babalj is a Serbian surname, found in Bosnia and Herzegovina. Notable people with the surname include:

Eli Babalj (born 1992), Australian footballer
Đorđe Babalj (born 1981), Bosnian-Serbian football goalkeeper

Serbian surnames